King Lindworm or Prince Lindworm (Danish: Kong Lindorm) is a Danish fairy tale published in the 19th century by Danish folklorist Svend Grundtvig.

It is classified in the Aarne–Thompson–Uther Index as tale type ATU 433B, a type that deals with maidens disenchanting serpentine husbands.

Summary 
In this tale from Scandinavian folklore, a "half-man, half-snake" lindworm is born, as one of twins, to a queen, who, in an effort to overcome her childless situation, has followed the advice of an old crone, who tells her to eat two onions. She did not peel the first onion, causing the first twin to be a lindworm. The second twin is perfect in every way. When he grows up and sets off to find a bride, the lindworm insists that a bride be found for him before his younger brother can marry.

Because none of the chosen maidens are pleased by him, he eats each until a shepherd's daughter who spoke to the same crone is brought to marry him, wearing every dress she owns. The lindworm tells her to take off her dress, but she insists he shed a skin for each dress she removes. Eventually his human form is revealed beneath the last skin. Some versions of the story omit the lindworm's twin, and the gender of the soothsayer varies.

Translations 
The tale was published in a compilation of tales "from the North" with illustrations by artist Kay Nielsen, with the title Prince Lindworm.

Analysis

Tale type 
The tale of Prince Lindworm is part of a multiverse of tales in which a maiden is betrothed or wooed by a prince enchanted to be a snake or other serpentine creature (ATU 433B, "The Prince as Serpent"; "King Lindworm").

In the first iteration of the international folktale classification, by folklorist Antti Aarne, he established that this tale type concerned about a childless queen who gives birth to a boy in snake form. The boy is only disenchanted by a maiden after they both undress and enter a bath.

The tale type can also be called King Wyvern, as per the studies of scholar Bengt Holbek.

Motifs 
According to Svend Grundtvig's system of folktale classification, translated by Astrid Lunding in 1910, this type (King-Snake or Kong Lindorm) may also show the maiden whipping the prince in the bridal bed in order to disenchant him.

Danish folklorist Axel Olrik, in his study, noted that the flower as a birthing implement appears in Asian tales (from India, China and Annam), and suggested that it may have been the origin of the motif in the Scandinavian tale.

Scholar , in his work about Cupid and Psyche and other Animal as Bridegroom tales, described that the King Lindworm tales are "usually characterized" by the motifs of "release by bathing" and "7 shifts and 7 skins".

Variants

Origins
According to scholar Christine Goldberg, an analysis of the tale type through the historic-geographic method by Anna Birgitta Waldmarson suggests that it has originated as simple legends in India and combined into a two-part tale in the Near East, migrating to Scandinavia in the 17th century. Folklorist Stith Thompson was also of the opinion that the continuation of the narrative with the adventures of the bride/wife, may have originally formed in the Near East.

Danish folklorist Axel Olrik also suggested that the origin of the story lay elsewhere than Scandinavia, since, etymologically speaking, the word lindworm appears in Germanic languages of medieval times, and may not hark back to an earlier period in Nordic history.

Distribution
A geographical analysis of variants by Stith Thompson led him to believe its origin lay in the East, since variants are found in India, in the Near East and in Scandinavia (in Denmark and in southern Sweden). In his study on the Danish story, Axel Olrik noted its "evenly distribution" over the North Sea, across the coast of Scania and into the Baltic Sea, with similar stories attested in South Germany and Southern Europe (frequent in Italy, but sparse in Albania and Portugal).

Europe

Denmark
Folklorist Axel Olrik reported other variants from Denmark: one from Vendsyssel, one from Himmerland, two from Vestjylland (one in Vedersø, the other in Ulborg), and two from the island of Sjælland (Zealand) (one from South Zealand, other from West Sealand).

The variant from Vendsyssel, translated by Klara Stroebe as King Dragon, continues with the banishment of the queen by the false hero Red Knight. Then, she goes to the woods and two giant birds, a swan and a crane, perch on a branch, each on either side of her. They beg to be given food, and the queen does. The two birds become human again, and tell her their names: King Stork and King Crane. Both want to marry the woman, now that she has broken their curse. At the end of the tale, the queen prepares a dinner with her new suitors and King Dragon, and, since the meal is salty, King Dragon makes a toast to the queen's health. She chooses to remain with King Dragon.

Sweden
Folklorist Andrew Lang translated and published a Swedish variant in his Pink Fairy Book with the title King Lindorm. The first part of story follows the tale type very closely, with the birth of the serpent boy and the marriage with the human maiden. In the second part of the story, the (now human) King Lindorm goes to war and leaves his expecting wife in her stepmother's care. His wife gives birth to twin boys, but the evil stepmother writes to her stepson-in-law that the queen gave birth to whelps. A faithful servant of King Lindorm hides the queen and her sons in the castle, but she moves out to a hut in the forest where a man named Peter lives. By living with him, the queen discovers Peter made a pact with "The Evil One" and is supposed to meet him in a dense forest. The queen decides to rescue his contract with the help of three nuts that sprouted on her mother's grave. The tale was originally collected by Eva Wigström (sv), from Landskrona.

Eva Wigstrom collected another variant from Landskrona with the title Kung Lindorm och Kung Trana ("King Lindworm and King Trana"): a prince is cursed by his stepmother to be a man by day and lindworm by night. Whenever he married, he killed the bride on the wedding night. The princess from a neighbouring kingdom falls in love with the prince, but is afraid of her fate in case she marries him. Her father advises her to marry him anyway, but to wear three layers of linen clothing, and to remove each one as the lindworm sheds a layer of his skin each time. The plot works and she breaks the curse. She has a son while her husband is at war, but his stepmother writes him that she gave birth to a puppie. She is expelled from the castle with her son and wanders about until they reach another castle in the woods. She takes refuge in the castle and see three birds alighting in a room and becoming human. They are princes, cursed by a witch to be birds by day and human at night. Their only salvation is if a woman comes to the castle and weave three shirts for them. The exiled queen comes out of hiding and offer her help. She disenchants the three men and marries the youngest of them, named King Trana. At the end of the tale, the queen has to make a choice between the King Lindworm and her new husband, King Trana.

Clara Stroebe published a variant from Södermanland, titled The Girl and the Snake. Stroebe compared it to the Danish "King Dragon".

Olrik also reported Swedish variants from Scania: one collected by Eva Wigström in West Scania, and another from South Scania, collected by Nicolovius.

Germany
In a tale from South Germany collected by Ignaz and Joseph Zingerle, titled Die Schlange ("The Snake"), a count's wife gives birth to a serpent son who lives in his own chamber. When the snake is twenty years old, it requests his mother to find him a wife. On her wedding night, the maiden wears seven layers of clothing, as she was instructed to do, and to dispose of each layer as her husband sheds his own layers of snakeskin.

Ludwig Bechstein published the tale Siebenhaut (de) ("Sevenskins"), wherein a count's wife, being insulted by her husband and called "a snake", gives birth to a snake. When the snake is twenty years old, it asks his mother to procure him a wife. A maiden, instructed by an angel in a dream, dresses in seven layers of clothing in order to redeem her husband and break his enchantment.

Ukraine
In a South Russian (Ukrainian) variant collected by Ukrainian folklorist  with the title "Уж-Царевич і Вірна Жона" ("Snake-Prince and his Wife"), a childless Tsaritsa is instructed to catch a pike, cook its head and eat it. She gives birth to a serpent. Soon after, her serpent son wants to be married, so she has every maiden of the kingdom brought before him to choose, but he rejects them all. Lastly, a woman with twelve daughters sends eleven of her daughters to the selection, but her youngest insists she be brought to the serpent tsarevich. The Tsar orders her to be taken to his presence, but she asks to be brought 20 sets of chemises, 20 pair of shoes, 20 linen kirtles and 20 woolen kirtles. She wears them to the bedchambers and casts off each layer as the serpent prince sheds 20 layers of skin and becomes human. The prince, now human, warns his wife that his parents must not know what happened, but she tells her parents-in-law and her husband disappears. She goes on a quest for him. She visits the Mother of the Winds, the Mother of the Moon and the Mother of the Sun and gains a silver apple, a golden apple and a diamond apple, which she uses to trade for three nights with her husband, who is to be married to an Empress. The tale was translated into English by Robert Nisbet Bain with the title The Serpent-Tsarevich and his Two Wives.

Serbia
Vuk Karadžić collected and published a Serbian variant titled Zmija mladoženja ("The Snake Bridegroom"): a queen wishes for a son, even if it is a serpent. A serpent prince is born and, when he comes of age, requests his mother to arrange a marriage with the king's daughter. After doing three tasks for the king, the serpent prince marries her. She discovers he is a handsome human prince when he takes off the snakeskin at night and conspires with her mother-in-law to burn the snakeskin. Croatian folklorist Maja Bošković-Stulli also classified the tale as type AaTh 433B.

Italy
In a Sicilian variant collected by Laura Gonzenbach, Die Geschichte vom Principe Scursuni ("The Story of Prince Scursuni"), a despondent queen longs for a child, so she asks God to give her one, "even if it was a scursuni" (a kind of serpent). God grants her wish: when in labor, every midwife drops dead at the sight of the baby. An evil stepmother sends her stepdaughter, a shoemakers's daughter, to suffer the same fate, but she helps in the prince's delivery. Years later, the serpent prince wants to marry. The king arranges a marriage with the weaver's daughter. At midnight in the bridal chamber, the prince casts off the serpent skin and asks his wife her origins; she reveals she is a weaver's daughter. Enraged, the prince yells he deserves only a princess for wife and kills the maiden. Another maiden suffers the same fate. Only the shoemaker's daughter is spared the grim fate because she lies about being a princess. They marry and she has a son, whom she hides from the royal family. One night, she reveals to the queen her son is an enchanted prince and only a certain method can break the curse: a white cloth is to be woven; an oven is to be heated tor three days and three nights; his skin is to be tossed in the fire while someone throws the white cloth over him and holds him so that he cannot jump into the fire. The process works; the maiden disenchants him and reveals her humble origins.

Italian author Italo Calvino located "other versions" wherein the snake prince sheds off his seven skins in Tuscany, Campania, Sicily and Piedmont.

Portugal
In a Portuguese variant collected by Adolfo Coelho with the title O Príncipe Sapo ("The Prince a Toad"), a queen wishes that God may give her a son, even if it is a frog. It so happens and a frog son is born. The king announces that whoever comes forth to raise and rear the frog prince shall have him for husband and the entire kingdom. A woman introduces herself to the king and raises the frog. As she does so, she notices that the frog is no ordinary animal. She has a dream about a voice telling her to marry the frog and on the wedding night wear 7 skirts, to take each skirt off as the frog sheds one of its skins. The maiden disenchants the prince, who reveals he is human, but prefers to use the frog skin. His wife tells the king and queen the situation and they burn the seven frog skins. The prince tells his wife he will disappear and if his wife ever sees him again, to give him a kiss on the mouth.

Spain
Spanish scholar  calls type 433B El príncipe serpiente mata a las novias ariscas/antipáticas ("The serpent prince kills the unpleasant brides").

In a Spanish variant collected in Cuenca by Aurélio M. Espinosa with the title El lagarto de las siete camisas ("The Lizard with Seven Skins"), a queen longs for a child, even if it is a lizard. God grants her wish and she gives birth to a lizard. Whenever a wet nurse tries to feed the child, the lizard bites off the wet nurse's breast. The royal couple finds a girl named Mariquita, who suckles the prince with a pair of iron breasts filled with milk. The lizard prince grows up and wants to marry. Mariquita's sisters are given to him: he expects his wife to stay awake and wait for him on their bed; they fail and he kills them. However, Mariquita stays awake and sees that the lizard is a prince underneath the animal skin. He puts the seven lizard skins on a couch and warns his wife not to touch them. Mariquita tells the queen about her son's secret and they decide to burn the lizard skins. They do and the prince disappears, which prompts a quest for him. This tale is classified as both ATU 433B and ATU 425A, "the Search for the Lost Husband".

Albania
In an Albanian tale collected by Johann Georg von Hahn with the title Das Schlangenkind ("The Snake-Child"), a king has no son. His wife is friends with the vizier's and they express their wishes to marry the prince to one of the vizier's three daughters, but the queen has no son. The queen says that God will provide her with a child, even if it is a snake. It just so happens. The snake prince grows large and asks his mother to marry one of the vizier's daughters. The two eldest refuse, but the youngest is forced to accept on penalty of the snake killing her entire family. The youngest is advised by an old woman to marry the snake anyway, but reveals he is in fact a handsome prince. The girl follows through with the marriage. On the wedding night, she wears 40 layers of clothing and takes off one by one as her snake husband sheds each of his 40 layers of skin. He becomes a normal human and tells his wife not to tell the queen. The princess breaks his trust. In return, he "closes her womb" and disappears. The princess dresses as a nun and goes on a quest for him. An old woman directs her to a pool of stagnant water she must drink from and compliment it; she then must ask for the earth to crack open and swallow her. On her new underground journey, she helps the three sisters of the sun and is gifted with a walnut, a hazelnut and an almond. At the last leg of her journey, the princess cracks opens the nuts to use its contents to buy three nights in her husband's bed from a false bride (tale type ATU 425A).

In an Albanian tale published by Post Wheeler with the title The Girl who took a Snake for a Husband, in a kingdom, a tradition holds that the princess must cast apples to the crowd to select their husbands. The third and youngest princess, called Lukja,  throws hers into a poor seller's cart, where a snake was hiding in. Worried about her lot, she consults with a Wise Woman, who reveals the snake is more than it seems, and that she can disenchant him by wearing 40 layers of silken robes, and instructs the girl to undress each layer as her snake husband loses each of his 40 scales. On the wedding night, princess Lukja does as instructed and he becomes a handsome man. The man takes off his snakeskin, but does not tell his true identity. They live as man and wife, even bearing the brunt of the other princesses' mockery. One day, on a celebration, the snake husband decides to dance with his wife in human form. Suspecting something is amiss, Lukja's sisters visit her home and notice the snakeskin. The princesses burn it and the snake man begins to fell dizzy. Lukja runs home and sees the ashes, then returns to her husband, who has vanished. Saddened and not knowing what to do, Lukja consults with the Wise Woman again, and learns the whole story: her husband is the son of the Snake King who lives in the Underworld, and has come to the "white world" with a snake skin that allowed him to be a snake by day and a man by night. Lukja decides to go there herself, but is warned that its entrance is very dangerous to enter, and that down there she will meet a Shtriga, "the grandmother of all the witches", before she even finds her husband. Lukja crosses through the passage with one of her husband's scales as protection amulet and reaches the confines of the Underworld, a place of a red sun, a green sky and black trees. She meets the Shtriga, performs three tasks for her with the help of a magic bag, and reaches the Snake Kingdom. Lukja learns that her father-in-law has become deaf, the mother-in-law has lost her speech, and her husband is blind, and that the only cure are the objects that she received as payment from the Shtriga.

North Macedonia
In a Judeo-Spanish variant collected by scholar Reginetta Haboucha from Skoplje, a childless queen longs to have a son, envying the fact that even a snake has its brood. For her wishes, she is cursed to bear a snake son. When he is born, every nursemaid is killed by him. A local stepmother sends her step-daughter to attend the snake prince, but she survives the ordeal. When the snake prince desires a bride, the stepmother sends the girl again, who once again survives the attempt by following the advice of her dead mother. She disenchants the snake prince and gives birth to her first son, but her stepmother expels her from the kingdom. In her wanderings, the princess meets another prince, who is cursed to become alive during the night and to fall into a dead-like state during the day. They live as husband and wife and she becomes pregnant again. She gives birth to her second son and her second husband comes in the night to rock the baby with a lullaby (tale type AaTh 425E, "Enchanted Husband Sings Lullaby").

In another Macedonian variant, a queen prays to have a son, and gives birth to a snake. However, her labour is a hard one, and they get the help from a girl. Later, the snake son wants to marry the same girl who helped in his delivery. The girl receives help from her dead mother on how to disenchant the snake prince by taking off his 40 layers of snakeskin.

Greece
The Greek Folktale Catalogue names tale type 433B as "Ο Όφις που έγινε βασιλόπουλο ή Η κόρη με τους δυο συζύγου" ("The Serpent Prince or The Girl with Two Husbands"), and registers 23 variants. Scholars Anna Angelopoulou, Aigle Broskou and Michael Meraklis remarked that Greek variants form an oikotype also found in Turkey: in the first part, the serpent prince is born, marries a human maiden and she disenchants him; in the second part, the maiden is exiled and either resurrects a dead man whom she marries, or she releases a prince from the fairies and bears his son in his mother's castle (tale type AaTh 425E). Either way, at the end of the variants, the maiden is forced to choose between two husbands.

A Greek variant from Thrace has been translated by Richard M. Dawkins with the name The Girl With Two Husbands. In this variant, as the snake prince lays off each layer of snakeskin, his bride throws it in the fire.

In another Greek variant, Tsyrógles, a girl convinces her father to marry a woman with a daughter. Her new step-family is cruel to her and mistreat the girl. The step-mother sends her with basketfuls of clothes to wash in the river. She is approached by an old beggar who asks for food and water. She gives her crust of bread and shares a bit of her jug of water. She also delouses the beggar and is blessed with golden hair and the ability to turn her clothes into gold. The step-mother, jealous of the step-daughter's good fortune, sends her own daughter to the beggar. She insults the man and receives a blessing of horns and prickles. Meanwhile, the childless royal couple prays to God for a son, even if it is a snake - which is exactly what they are expecting. The snake son (called Ophis) needs to be suckled, so the step-mother sends her step-daughter to do it. The girl weeps on her mother's grave, and her spirit gives her advice on how to do it. Later, the snake son decides to marry, and the step-mother suggests that the girl who suckled the snake prince should marry it. The girl once again seeks counsel with her mother's spirit, who says she must prepare seven garments and seven ovens, and ask the snake husband to undress each layer of snakeskin first as she takes off each garment. The girl disenchants her husband by throwing his seven layers of snakeskin in the ovens. She gives birth to a son and Ophis, now human, goes to war. The girl's step-mother falsifies a letter with an order to expel the girl with her son from the palace. On her wanderings, she enters a church and meets a being named Tsyrógles. She later disenchants him into human form and marries him. Ophis returns from war and, seeing his wife is not there, discovers she is now marries to Tsyrógles in another kingdom. Torn between her love for Ophis and her love for Tsyrógles, she dies of a broken heart. Dawkins, in his book Modern Greek Folktales, sourced this version as from Skyros and remarked that the Greek name of the hero, Τσίρογλéσ, corresponded to Turkish Köroglu, which may hint at an Eastern origin for the tale.

In a variant from Epirus collected by Austrian consul Johann Georg von Hahn, Schlangenkind ("Snake-Child"), a queen wishes for a son, even if it is a snake. She gives birth to one. One day, the snake asks his mother to find him a wife. She goes to church and announces her request. The churchgoers laugh at her, but a step-mother promises to send her step-daughter to be the snake's wife. The step-daughter goes to her mother's grave to cry over her sad situation, but she has a dream about her mother telling her to burn her husband's snakeskin. She does and disenchants him. One day, he is summoned to go to war, and leaves his wife at home. The step-mother, envious of her good luck, banishes the prince's wife to a desert. The princess laments her fate, and her tears water the earth, resurrecting a man named Kyrikos, who becomes her companion. At the end of the tale, the princess must choose between the (now human) snake prince and Kyrikos.

Von Hahn collected another variant from Zagori: the first part is largely the same, but on the second part, the girl awakens a man named Kirigli. The conclusion of the tale is similar: the princess must make a choice between two husbands.

Armenia
According to Armenian scholarship, seven Armenian variants are listed in the international index as type ATU 433 (although the Armenian Folktale Catalogue groups them under its own type, ATU 446). In the second part of these tales, the wife of the serpent prince meets another man, whose name may be Arevmanuk, Arin-Armanelin, or Aliksannos.

In a 1991 article, researcher  noted a combination between tale type 433, "The Prince as Serpent" (called Odzmanuk in Armenian variants), and an independent type indexed as type 446, "Муж, умирающий на день" (English: "Husband that dies during the day"). In the latter type, a youth named Arevmanuk ("Sun Youth") tries to shoot at the Sun, who, annoyed at this provocation, curses him to sleep during the day and never see the sun again; Arevmanuk's mother, then, travels to the Sun in order to reverse the curse. Gullakian stated that, when this type combines with type 433, it retains the youth cursed to die during the day, but removes the Sun's curse and the youth's mother's journey.

In an Armenian variant, Enfant-Serpent, Enfant-Soleil or Dragon-Child and Sun-Child, the king has no children, and sighs that even a serpent has its young. God answers his prayers and the queen gives birth to a snake. The snake is given a girl to feed every week, and when it grows old, shall be given a young woman. The time comes when the daughter of a poor man is selected to be delivered to the snake. Her step-mother insists the girl should be given as the sacrifice, instead of her own daughter. The girl cries to God; He appears in her dreams with the solution: her father should prepare three pots of milk, she should wear a mule (or bull's) skin and be suspended over a well; the snake will ask her to take off her garments, and she should thrice answer the snake prince must first take off his; she should then cut the rope that ties her, jump into the well and wash the prince with the milk. She follows His instructions to the letter and disenchants the prince to a normal human. They marry. One day, while the prince is away, the princess's stepmother shoves her down in the sea and she is washed away. The princess survives, wanders a long time until she finds a cottage, a men asleep inside. The man awakens and explains he cannot leave the cottage at all, lest he dies a horrible death. The princess, then, becomes the man's companion, who is named Sun-Child. The tale was originally collected by ethnologue and clergyman Karekin Servantsians in Hamov-Hotov (1884) with the title "ՕՁԷՄԱՆՈՒԿ, ԱՐԵՒՄԱՆՈՒԿ" (Armenian: "Ojmanuk, Arevmanuk")

In an unpublished Armenian variant collected by Susan Hoogasian-Villa from a Mrs. Katoon Mouradian, The Wicked Stepmother, a dervish gives an almond to the king to cure the queen's barrenness. The queen bears a snake for a son, and the story attributes this to the almond peel. The snake is to be given a girl to devour every day. A poor man's daughter is selected as the new sacrifice, and she has a dream that she must take a pail of milk and wash the snake being with it. She disenchants him to a normal human being. The now human prince explains that the other girls are actually alive and married to personifications of the elements. The girl and the prince marry, until he has a dream and must go to war. Some incidents occur during the tale, but the girl's step-mother throws her down the river, and she washes ashore in a "dark world". In this strange new realm, she meets a man that is blind during the day and can see at night. At the end of the tale, the girl must choose between the snake husband and her new paramour, to whom she has begotten a son. Both Susan Hoogasian-Villa and D. L. Ashliman grouped this tale with others of type 433B.

Ubykh people
In a tale collected by Georges Dumézil from Ubykh teller Alemkeri Hunç, La femme qui épousa un serpent et un mort ("The woman who married a serpent and a dead man"), a prince and his wife have a serpent as a son, which they give to a woman to rear and suckle. When the serpent prince is fifteen years old, his parents order the woman to give her daughter as wife to the serpent. Before the girl goes to marry the prince, a neighbour advises her to wear a hedgehog skin as chemise. On the wedding night, her serpent husband insists the girl takes off the skin, but she replies he must take off his. She disenchants her husband, who becomes a fine youth. One day, the now human prince goes to a hunt and orders the servants to forbid his wife to have any contact with any stranger while he is away. However, his father-in-law falls ill and the girl visits her father. Her step-mother takes her to the forest to get some herbs, while she dresses her own daughter as the girl and passes her off as the serpent prince's true wife. Meanwhile, the girl becomes lost in the woods and finds her way to a hut. Inside the hut, a tomb opens up and a youth comes out of it, eats food from a table and returns to the tomb. The next day, they meet each other. The days pass and they live as man and wife, and a child is born to them. Dumézil also classified the tale as type TTV 106 (of the Turkish Catalogue) and AaTh 433B (Aarne-Thompson Index).

Georgia
Georgian scholarship registers its own tale type for the second part of the story (exiled heroine finds a dead man). In this Georgian type, numbered -446*, "Husband Seemingly Dying at the Daytime", the heroine finds a man at a church, who dies during the day and revives at night. They marry, she bears him a son and he is captured and dies for good. The heroine goes to the Mother of the Sun for a cure. Georgian scholarship noted that this narrative sequence was "contaminated" with type 433B, "The Prince as Serpent".

Middle East

Turkey
Scholarship states that Turkish variants show as a first part the sequence of tale type 433B, while their second part follows what Georges Dumézil termed "The woman who married a Snake and a Dead Man".

In the Typen türkischer Volksmärchen ("Turkish Folktale Catalogue"), by Wolfram Eberhard and Pertev Naili Boratav, both scholars grouped Turkish variants under one type: TTV 106, "Die schwarze Schlange" ("The Black Snake"), which corresponded in the international classification to tale type AaTh 433. They also commented that the stories followed a two-part narrative: a first part, with the disenchantment of the snake prince, and a second one, wherein the expelled heroine meets a man in the graveyard and marries him.

Turkologist Ignác Kúnos collected a Turkish tale titled Der Drachenprinz und die Stiefmutter ("The Dragon-Prince and the Stepmother"). In this story, a padishah wants to have a child, so he prays to Allah for a son after seeing a dragon stroll along with its children. His wife becomes pregnant but, by the time of the baby's delivery, every midwife dies of shock. A mean stepmother sends her stepdaughter to suffer the same fate, but the maiden cries on her mother's grave and her spirit counsels the daughter. The maiden successfully helps the padishah's son: a dragon. Later, the dragon wants to be educated, so the stepmother tries the same trick, but the maiden goes unscathed. The dragon, finally, wants to be married, but every maiden is devoured every night, a fate the stepmother wishes on her stepdaughter. The maiden is once again helped by her mother's spirit and is instructed to wear seven layers of clothing on her wedding night to disenchant the dragon. At last, the stepmother is triumphant: she succeeds in expelling the newly crowned princess after the Drachenprinz (now human) goes to war. She wanders about until she reaches a fountain, a coffin nearby, holding a youth. When night comes, forty pigeons alight in the fountain, become women, run to the coffin and wake the youth up with a magical stick. The resurrected youth talks with the women until dawn, when the maidens touch him with the stick again and he falls into a death-like state. The Dragon-Prince's wife repeats the magical action and wake the youth, who tells her he was stolen as a boy by the peris. They fall in love and she becomes heavy with his child. One day, the youth sends the woman to his mother's castle so she can give birth there, away from the peris that come at night.

Turkologist  translated another Turkish variant, Die Geschichte von der Schwarzen Schlange ("The Story of the Black Serpent"). In this story, a padishah meets a man on his travels, who gives him an apple. He instructs the padishah to eat half and to give half for his wife. She becomes pregnant, but the baby won't exit her womb. A woman is called in a hurry to act as midwife, and helps deliver the prince: a black snake. The same woman ends up acting as the snake's preceptor, after he tries to eat previous ones. Finally, the black snake wants to marry, but every bride is killed by him. The same woman is advised by her mother's spirit to wear 41 hedgehog skins on the nuptial night. She disenchants him into a human prince. As the story continues, while her husband, now human, goes to war, an envious slave exchanges letters and delivers an order to break the princess's arm and to throw her out. The exiled princess finds another man and has further adventures.

Israel 
In a Jewish tale published by author Peninnah Schram with the title The Fisherman's Daughter, a poor fisherman lives with his only daughter, beautiful Esther. Their neighbour, an old woman, tells Esther to convince her father to remarry, and the old woman offers to be the intended wife. One day, the local king and queen announce they will have a child, and hire help in the delivery of the prince, since every midwife has died in the process. Esther new step-mother suggests the king takes her as midwife - in hopes she falls dead, like the others -, but Esther is advised by a mermaid-princess on how to deliver the baby. A snake is born to the king and queen. When the prince is five, he begins to learn the Torah, but every tutor he has also dies. Once again, Esther is named by her step-mother as the prince's preceptor. The girl goes to the palace and burns a second hair of the mermaid-princess, who advises her again. Lastly, years later, the prince is at a marriageable age and asks his parents for a bride. The prince marries a selection of brides, but they die on the wedding night. As a final trap set by her step-mother, Esther is given to the snake as his bride. The girl burns the last hair of the mermaid-princess and is advised on how to disenchant him. At the end of the night, the snake prince sheds his seven snakeskins and becomes human. Esther tells him he is only a fisherman's daughter, but the prince declares that her father shall become his vizier. The step-mother, seeing that her plans failed, enters the sea and drowns.

Africa

Sudan
Professor Samia Al Azharia John collected two variants from two Berber sisters, in the northern part of Sudan. In both tales, the animal groom is a crocodile: in one, he is born of his parents, in the other, he hides in an old woman's basket. At the end of both tales, the heroine disenchants him by beating the crocodile with palm leaves given to her by a mysterious helper.

Southern Africa
Africanist Sigrid Schmidt stated that "King Lindworm" was "particularly widespread" in Southern parts of Africa. In African tales (for instance, from the Sotho, Xhosa and the Zulu), a snake is born to a royal couple, who hides the snake son, until one day he decides to get married. In some variants, his future bride is repulsed by his snake appearance and flees from him, and he goes after her. The snake creature's skin is torn out by blades put in the way and he becomes a man. In some tales, the human-animal marriage occurs to ensure access to bodies of water for the people.

Americas

Brazil
In a tale from Brazil with the name O Príncipe Lagartão, the queen wishes to have a son, even if it is a lizard. Nine months later, she is on the brink to deliver her baby, a voice from inside her womb says it wants a girl named Maria to deliver him. They find the girl and she helps in the prince's delivery. She also raises him. When he is older, the lizard prince wants to marry Maria. The girl goes to her godmother, Virgin Mary, who advises her to wear seven skirts and to take a bowl of perfumed water to help disenchant him.

Parallels
Croatian folklorist Maja Bošković-Stulli noted that the theme of the Snake-Bridegroom is very popular in Serbo-Croatian epic songs. In most of the ballads of this type, both heroine and the serpent's mother burn the animal skin; the serpent may die or live, according to the version.

See also 
Therianthropy, Shapeshifting, Monstrous bridegroom
Eglė the Queen of Serpents (Lithuanian fairy tale)
The Green Serpent (French literary fairy tale)
The Snake Prince (Indian fairy tale)
The Enchanted Snake (Italian literary fairy tale)
Tulisa, the Wood-Cutter's Daughter (Indian fairy tale)
Princess Himal and Nagaray (Kashmiri folktale)
Champavati (Assamese folktale)
 The Ruby Prince (Punjabi folktale)
 The King of the Snakes (Chinese folktale)

References

Footnotes

Further reading
 Behr-Glinka, Andrei I. "Змея как сексуальный и брачный партнер человека. (Еще раз о семантике образа змеи в фольклорной традиции европейских народов)" [Serpent as a Bride and an Intimate Partner of a Man. Once more about the semantics of serpent in European folk-lore]. In: Культурные взаимодействия. Динамика и смыслы. Издательский дом Stratum, Университет «Высшая антропологическая школа», 2016. pp. 435–575.

External links
 Folktales about snake husbands, by D. L. Ashliman

Danish fairy tales
Fiction about shapeshifting
European folklore
Love stories
Legendary serpents
ATU 400-459